For the Canadian community, see Paradise River, Newfoundland and Labrador

The Paradise River is a small, short but swift river in Pierce County, Washington.  It is the first major tributary of the Nisqually River.  Located entirely within the bounds of Mount Rainier National Park, it is notable for its waterfalls, of which there are eight.

Course 
The Paradise River originates at the toe of the Paradise Glacier.  It drops over Paradise Falls and Sluiskin Falls as it drops swiftly downhill into Paradise Valley.  Just before entering the valley it receives Edith Creek, which also has many waterfalls along its course. From there, the river flows generally southwest.  After flowing out of Paradise Valley, the river drops over Ruby Falls and the Washington Cascades.  Not long after that, the river widens out and drops over probably the most famous and well known waterfall in the Mount Rainier area, Narada Falls, and soon after is crossed by the Mount Rainier Highway.  Narada Falls is soon followed by the seldom-seen Sidewinder Cascades.  A ways past Narada Falls, the river drops over Madcap Falls before it is joined soon after by Tatoosh Creek, which also has more than one major waterfall along its course.  After that the river turns west, drops over Carter Falls soon after, and makes its final push toward its confluence with the Nisqually River.

See also
List of rivers in Washington
Paradise River Waterfalls

External links

 

Rivers of Washington (state)
Rivers of Pierce County, Washington
Rivers of Lewis County, Washington